Chelmsford is a rural locality in the South Burnett Region, Queensland, Australia. In the  Chelmsford had a population of 124 people.

History 
Chelmsford State School opened on 23 August 1910. It closed circa 1972. The school was located on the south-east corner of the intersection of Tingoora Chelmsford Road and Springs Road / Old Chemsford Road.

In the  Chelmsford had a population of 124 people.

References 

South Burnett Region
Localities in Queensland